Siller is a surname. Notable people with the surname include:

Esteban Siller (1931–2013), Mexican voice actor
Eugenio Siller (born 1981), Mexican actor, singer, and model
Jerónimo Siller (1880–1962), Mexican inventor, politician and military man 
Morag Siller (1969–2016), Scottish actress, voice artist, and radio personality
Raymond Siller (born 1939), American television writer and political consultant
Sebastian Siller (born 1989), Austrian footballer

See also
Sillers